Askestan (also Romanized as Askestān; also known as Asgestān and Askistan) is a village in Shahrud Rural District, Shahrud District, Khalkhal County, Ardabil Province, Iran. At the 2006 census, its population was 641, in 190 families.

References 

Tageo

Towns and villages in Khalkhal County